Casinhas or little houses (population: 14,368) is a city in northeastern Brazil, in the State of Pernambuco. It lies in the mesoregion of Agreste of Pernambuco and has 125.28 sq/km of total area.

Geography

 State - Pernambuco
 Region - Agreste of Pernambuco
 Boundaries - Paraiba  (N), Surubim   (S)   Bom Jardim and Orobó  (E);  Vertentes do Lério   (W).
 Area - 125.28 km2
 Elevation - 390 m
 Hydrography - Capibaribe and Goiana Rivers
 Vegetation - Caatinga hipoxerófila
 Annual average temperature - 23.3 c
 Distance to Recife - 133 km

Economy

The main economic activities in Casinhas is agribusiness, especially farming of cattle, goats and sheep.

Economic Indicators

Economy by Sector
2006

Health Indicators

References

Municipalities in Pernambuco